{{DISPLAYTITLE:C3H7NO3}}
The molecular formula C3H7NO3 (molar mass: 105.09 g/mol, exact mass: 105.0426 u) may refer to:

 Isopropyl nitrate (IPN)
 Isoserine
 Serine

Molecular formulas